= Güriin Ragchaa =

Mongolian General (1946–2009)

Güriin Ragchaa (Mongolian: Гүрийн Рагчаа; December 1946 – 2009) was a Mongolian major general. He was a key figure in the creation of the Mongolian international peace keeping forces.
